KRGT (99.3 MHz) is a commercial FM radio station located in Sunrise Manor, Nevada, broadcasting to the Las Vegas, Nevada area. KRGT airs a Spanish urban format branded as "99.3 Latino Mix". This station also routinely plays English language pop hits by non-Hispanic artists. Its studios are in Spring Valley, Nevada, and its transmitter is on Angel Peak west of the Las Vegas Valley. KRGT is owned by Latino Media Network; under a local marketing agreement, it is programmed by previous owner TelevisaUnivision's Uforia Audio Network.

History
The station signed on in 2000 as KPXG. The station permit had existed for years and had been planned as a 6,000-watt operation. Changes were made to run it as a minimal 100 watt operation. The station was owned by Claire "Reis" Benesara, manager of KDWN radio in its pre-Beasley days.

The engineering department of HBC (predecessor of present-day Uforia Audio Network) moved several stations around in frequency and moved the station to Angel Peak where it operates as a class C zero station. Dana Demerjiana was GM, Eric Martel was the engineering manager, and David Stewart of HBC corporate organised the upgrade (basically an HBC specialty).

KRGT was one of eighteen radio stations that TelevisaUnivision sold to Latino Media Network in a $60 million deal announced in June 2022, approved by the Federal Communications Commission (FCC) that November, and completed in January 2023. Under the terms of the deal, Univision agreed to continue programming the station for up to one year under a local marketing agreement.

References

External links
Latino Mix 99.3 FM

 Origins of the Call Letters

RGT
Univision Radio Network stations
Radio stations established in 2000
Contemporary hit radio stations in the United States
Spanish-language radio stations in the United States